Jim Griffin, Jimmy Griffin or James Griffin may refer to:

James Aloysius Griffin (1883–1948), American prelate of the Roman Catholic Church
James Anthony Griffin (born 1934), American prelate of the Roman Catholic Church
James Bennett Griffin (1905–1997), American archaeologist
James D. Griffin (1929–2008), former American politician and mayor of Buffalo, New York
James Griffin (defensive back) (born 1961), American football player
James Griffin (American football coach) (1918–1992), American football coach
James Griffin (Australian politician), member of the New South Wales Legislative Assembly
James Griffin (Irish politician) (1899–1959), Irish Fianna Fáil politician from Meath
James Griffin (philosopher) (1933–2019), former White's Professor of Moral Philosophy at the University of Oxford
James Griffin (songwriter), Australian singer / songwriter
James J. Griffin (born 1949), American writer of Westerns
James W. Griffin (born 1935), American politician in the state of Iowa
Jim Griffin (footballer) (born 1967), Scottish footballer who played for Motherwell FC
Jimmy Griffin (James Arthur Griffin, 1943–2005), American musician, member of Bread
James D. Griffin (scientist), American physician-scientist and cancer expert

See also
James Griffin Stadium, a stadium named after James S. Griffin, the first black police captain in St. Paul, MN
James Griffin Boswell (1882–1952), founder of the J. G. Boswell Company
Jim Griffen, New Zealand rugby league player